Bida is a former Ancient city and bishopric in Roman Africa, now a Latin Catholic titular see.

Its presumed location are the ruins at present Djemaa Saharidj in modern Algeria.

History 
The city was important enough in the Roman province of Mauretania Caesariensis to become a suffragan bishopric of its capital's Metropolitan Archbishop, but was to fade.  Campanus represented Bida at the Council of Carthage (424).

Titular see 
The diocese was nominally restored as a Latin Catholic titular bishopric in the 17th century as Bitha or Bita, renamed Bida in 1923–25.

It has had the following incumbents, all of the lowest (episcopal) rank :
 Guillaume Mahot, Paris Foreign Missions Society M.E.P. (1680.01.29 – 1684.06.04)
 Jean-Paul-Hilaire-Michel Courvezy, M.E.P. (1832.04.05 – 1857.05.01)
 Franz Rudolf Bornewasser (1921.04.23 – 1922.03.12) (later Archbishop)
 Frederick Eis (1922.07.08 – 1926.05.05)
 Carlos Labbé Márquez (1926.08.02 – 1929.12.20)
 James Augustine McFadden (1932.05.12 – 1943.06.02)
 Alexandre-Joseph-Charles Derouineau (德為能), M.E.P. (1943.12.08 – 1946.04.11) (later Archbishop)
 Aloysius Joseph Willinger, Redemptorists (C.SS.R.) (1946.12.12 – 1953.01.03)
 Ubaldo Evaristo Cibrián Fernández, Passionists (C.P.) (1953.03.07 – 1965.04.14)
 John Joseph Cassata (1968.03.12 – 1969.08.22)
 Norman Francis McFarland (1970.06.05 – 1976.02.10)
 Heinrich Machens (1976.03.24 – 2001.02.17)
 Sofronio Aguirre Bancud, Congregation of the Blessed Sacrament (S.S.S.) (2001.05.24 – 2004.11.06)
 Julio Hernando García Peláez (2005.02.11 – 2010.06.05)
 Eugenio Scarpellini (2010.07.15 – 2013.07.26)
 Áureo Patricio Bonilla Bonilla, Friars Minor (O.F.M.) (2013.10.29 – ...), Apostolic Vicar of Galápagos (Ecuador)

See also 
 Catholic Church in Algeria
 Bita (Mauretania), in Mauretania Caesariensis

References

External links 
 GCatholic with titular incumbent links

Catholic titular sees in Africa